Unfamiliar Faces is the second studio album by Matt Costa, released on January 22, 2008. In the spring of 2007, Costa teamed up with long-time friend/producer Tom Dumont (No Doubt guitarist) and recorded twelve songs for the album.

CD Track listing
 "Mr. Pitiful" - 2:56
 "Lilacs" - 4:15
 "Never Looking Back" - 4:04
 "Emergency Call" - 4:59
 "Vienna" - 4:04
 "Unfamiliar Faces" - 4:06
 "Cigarette Eyes" - 3:18
 "Downfall" - 2:47
 "Trying to Lose My Mind" 3:52
 "Bound" - 5:09
 "Heart of Stone" - 3:54
 "Miss Magnolia" - 3:19
European bonus track:
13. "Lovin' (feat. Ane Brun)" - 1:52

Double Vinyl LP Track listing
On February 5 Brushfire Records will release the double vinyl version of Unfamiliar Faces, pressed at Nashville's historic United Record Pressing

Side A:
 "Mr. Pitiful"
 "Lilacs"
 "Never Looking Back"
 "Emergency Call"
Side B:
 "Vienna"
 "Unfamiliar Faces"
 "Cigarette Eyes"
 "Downfall"
Side C:
 "Trying To Lose My Mind"
 "Bound"
 "Heart Of Stone"
 "Miss Magnolia"
Side D (etched vinyl):

Sales and chart performance
Unfamiliar Faces debuted at number 59 on the U.S. Billboard 200 chart, selling about 11,000 copies in its first week.
The album received mixed reviews, gaining a score of 59 on metacritic.com and 30 from the Observer music monthly.

Notes
"Mr. Pitiful" was the first single to be released from this album on October 7, 2007.
"Mr. Pitiful" was released as a free "Single of the Week" on the iTunes Music Store in Canada and Australia.
"Mr. Pitiful" is used in commercials for the iPhone 3GS.
"Mr. Pitiful" is featured in the movie and also appears on the soundtrack for the film, I Love You, Man.

References

2008 albums
Matt Costa albums